Mount Edziza Provincial Park is a provincial park in Cassiar Land District of northern British Columbia, Canada. It was established on 27 July 1972 to protect the Mount Edziza volcanic complex and the surrounding Tahltan Highland.

Geography
The park is dominated by the Mount Edziza volcanic complex, a large group of overlapping shield volcanoes, stratovolcanoes, cinder cones, lava domes and calderas oriented in a north−south trending line. It includes Mount Edziza at its northern end and the Spectrum Range at its southern end, both of which are within the boundaries of Mount Edziza Provincial Park.

See also
Obsidian Ridge
Stikine River Provincial Park

References

External links

Provincial parks of British Columbia
Tahltan Highland
1972 establishments in British Columbia
Protected areas established in 1972
Stikine Country